The Gomantong myotis (Myotis gomantongensis) is a species of bat in the family Vespertilionidae that is endemic to Sabah district of Malaysia.

Habitat
The species live in limestone caves, where it breeds and lives in small colonies. Their diet is unknown.

Threats
The species were under Data Deficient status in 2000, however, as of 2008 it is now on Least Concern status. Currently they are under protection at Gomantong Forest Reserve, which is their home.

References

Mammals described in 1998
Mouse-eared bats
Bats of Asia
Endemic fauna of Malaysia
Endemic fauna of Borneo
Mammals of Borneo
Taxonomy articles created by Polbot